Alphie was an educational robot toy popular in the 1980s. It featured a slot in the front for interchangeable cards which lined up with special soft-touch input function buttons built into the front of the toy. It ran on batteries and came with different insert cards to help children learn math, spelling, matching skills, etc. The toy also played music.

The original Alphie was released in 1978. Alphie II was released in 1983.

Reviews for the Alphie range from calling the Alphie "highly educational" to saying Alphie "scares [their] child".

References

Educational robots
Educational toys
Hasbro products
1980s toys